Bloomington West Side Historic District is a national historic district located at Bloomington, Monroe County, Indiana.  The district encompasses 394 contributing buildings, 2 contributing sites, and 2 contributing structures in a mixed residential, commercial, and industrial section of Bloomington.  It developed between about 1850 and 1946, and includes notable examples of Queen Anne and Bungalow/American Craftsman style architecture.  Located in the district are the separately listed Elias Abel House, Cantol Wax Company Building, Coca-Cola Bottling Plant, Cochran-Helton-Lindley House, Illinois Central Railroad Freight Depot, Johnson's Creamery, and Second Baptist Church. Other notable contributing resources include the Works Progress Administration constructed wading pool, White Oak Cemetery, Ninth Street Park, Bloomington Wholesale Foods Warehouse (c. 1920), Bloomington Garage, Curry Buick, Banneker School, Bethel African Methodist Episcopal Church, and Bloomington Frosted Foods.

It was listed on the National Register of Historic Places in 1997.

Gallery

References

Works Progress Administration in Indiana
Historic districts on the National Register of Historic Places in Indiana
Bungalow architecture in Indiana
Queen Anne architecture in Indiana
Buildings and structures in Bloomington, Indiana
Historic districts in Monroe County, Indiana
National Register of Historic Places in Monroe County, Indiana